Hamp and Getz is an album by vibraphonist Lionel Hampton and saxophonist Stan Getz recorded in 1955 and first released on the Norgran label.

Reception
The Billboard review published at the end of December 1955 stated: "Hampton is the stronger spirit of the two, and under his spell, Getz plays a guttier, less inhibited horn than usual." The Allmusic review awarded the album 4½ stars, stating: "The cool tenor of Stan Getz and the extroverted vibraphonist Lionel Hampton might have seemed like an unlikely matchup but once again producer Norman Granz showed his talents at combining complementary talents... Classic music from two of the best".

Track listing
 "Cherokee" (Ray Noble) - 9:15
 "Ballad Medley: Tenderly/Autumn in New York/East of the Sun (and West of the Moon)/I Can't Get Started" (Walter Gross, Jack Lawrence/Vernon Duke/Brooks Bowman/Duke, Ira Gershwin) - 8:08
 "Louise" (Leo Robin, Richard A. Whiting) - 6:47
 "Jumpin' at the Woodside" (Count Basie) - 8:24
 "Gladys" [Alternate Take] (Lionel Hampton) - 6:13 Bonus track on CD reissue
 "Gladys" [Master Take] (Hampton) - 7:43
 "Headache" (Unknown) - 5:07 Bonus track on CD reissue

Personnel 
Lionel Hampton - vibraphone
Stan Getz - tenor saxophone
Lou Levy - piano
Leroy Vinnegar - bass
Shelly Manne - drums
 Unknown - trombone

References 

1955 albums
Stan Getz albums
Lionel Hampton albums
Verve Records albums
Norgran Records albums
Albums produced by Norman Granz